Aghcheh Kohel (also Romanized as Āghcheh Kohel; also known as Āghjeh Kohel) is a village in Sarajuy-ye Jonubi Rural District of Saraju District, Maragheh County, East Azerbaijan province, Iran. At the 2006 National Census, its population was 608 in 107 households. The following census in 2011 counted 764 people in 196 households. The latest census in 2016 showed a population of 761 people in 228 households; it was the largest village in its rural district.

References 

Maragheh County

Populated places in East Azerbaijan Province

Populated places in Maragheh County